The Lakes Golf Club is one of Australia's premier golf courses, located in the Sydney suburb of Eastlakes in New South Wales. Founded in 1928,
this prestigious private golf course is approximately a 10-minute drive from Sydney central business district. The course, designed by Mike Clayton (now Ogilvy Clayton Cocking Mead) had a waiting list for full seven-day playing members and attracted a joining fee of A$33,000 in 2012.

The course has hosted the Australian Open seven times, most recently in 2018. The first two events were won by legends Jack Nicklaus and Greg Norman. The event also hosted the 1973 Chrysler Classic, an official event on the Australasian Tour, which was won by Lee Trevino.

Tournaments hosted
The Lakes has hosted the Australian Open on seven occasions.

1964  Jack Nicklaus
1980  Greg Norman
1992  Steve Elkington
2010  Geoff Ogilvy
2011  Greg Chalmers
2012  Peter Senior
2018  Abraham Ancer

It has hosted other events including the Australian PGA Championship, Ampol Tournament, Wills Classic, Wills Masters, Chrysler Classic, Johnnie Walker Australian Classic, Greg Norman Holden International and the ANZ Championship.

The club also organised the Lakes Open between 1934 and 1974 and hosted the Lakes International Cup between 1934 and 1954.

See also
List of golf courses in New South Wales

References

External links
The Lakes Golf Club Profile, Golf Australia

1928 establishments in Australia
Sports venues completed in 1928
Golf clubs and courses in New South Wales
Sporting clubs in Sydney
Sports venues in Sydney
Bayside Council